The Palm Beach Story is a 1942 screwball comedy film written and directed by Preston Sturges, and starring Claudette Colbert, Joel McCrea, Mary Astor and Rudy Vallée. Victor Young contributed the musical score, including a fast-paced variation of the William Tell Overture for the opening scenes. Typical of a Sturges film, the pacing and dialogue of The Palm Beach Story are very fast.

Plot
Inventor Tom Jeffers and his wife Gerry are down on their luck financially. Married for five years, the couple is still waiting for Tom's success. Anxious for the finer things in a life, Gerry decides that they both would be better off if they split. But before she can act, she ends up entangled with the Wienie King, a strange older man being shown around her apartment with his wife by a building manager anxious to rent it out from beneath his delinquent tenants. Sympathetic to her plight - and utterly taken by her youth and charm - the man gives her $700 from a giant roll of cash he keeps in his pocket. This is enough to get their rent current, pay off their most urgent bills, buy a new dress, take Tom to an expensive dinner, and still leave $14 and change in pocket money for Tom, and then she says she's leaving him.

In spite of a night of amour following their tipsy return home after their dinner, she awakens early, packs a bag, and makes for the train station. Bound for Palm Beach, Florida, her plan is to get a divorce, meet and marry a wealthy man who can both give her what she craves and also help Tom. Penniless, and repeatedly escaping from Tom's clutches, she is finally invited to travel for free as a guest on the private car of the well-to-do and soused Ale and Quail Club.

When the Club proves too rowdy and repeatedly fire off hunting rifles in the private car, nearly killing their bartender, she flees to the upper berth of a Pullman car, in the process meeting the meek, eccentric, amiable, and bespectacled John D. Hackensacker III (played by Rudy Vallée), who immediately falls for her.

Left without her clothes or purse in the chaos of her flight from the Ale and Quail reverie, she willingly accepts Hackensacker's chivalrous charity, although she doesn't know who he is. This takes a dramatic turn towards extravagance during a shopping spree for ladies finery he instigates in Jacksonville, swirling from trifles to haute couture and jewelry encrusted with precious stones.

Only when Hackensacker hands the store manager a card telling him to charge it all to him is it revealed he is the third richest men in the world and owner of the Erl King, a fabulous yacht, which the twosome board for the final leg of the journey to Palm Beach.

Back in New York, the now despondent Tom receives the same kind of generous no-strings-attached charity from the Wienie King he had accused Gerry of trading sexual favors with, which helps clear his mind. The King encourages him to rent a plane, fly to Florida, and show up with a bouquet of roses to win back his bride.

Arriving in Palm Beach, Tom is directed to the dock and Hackensacker's yacht. There he sees the affectionate new couple aboard. Failing to run him off on shore, a flustered Gerry introduces Tom as her brother, Captain McGlue. Hackensacker's oft-married, man-hungry sister, Princess Centimillia (Mary Astor), is immediately smitten with Tom, dismissing her current lover, the bumbling Toto, by asking him to retrieve a handkerchief.

When Gerry tells Hackensacker, who is working his way to propose to her, that her "brother" is a partner with her husband in the same investment, Hackensacker agrees to back it, saying he likes the Captain and it will keep it "all in the family" once they are married.

Invited to stay at the Princess' estate, the Jeffers' couple valiantly try to maintain their farce – while Tom reluctantly wrangles to win Gerry back, and Gerry determinedly seeks to stick to her original plan. Until, to the strains of Hackensacker crooning "Goodnight Sweetheart" beneath their window, the couple end up romantically entangled just as they had their last night together.

Reunited and unmasked the next morning, they confess the ruse to the Hackensackers. After John agrees to finance Tom's invention as simply a "good investment", sans sentimentality, and Tom and Gerry are asked if they have a brother and a sister. They do...twins!

There is an elaborate dual wedding, with Tom as best man and Gerry as matron of honor, John Hackensacker hand-in-hand with Gerry's sister and the Princess with Tom's brother. A title card tells us that they "lived happily ever after...or did they?", before credits roll.

Cast 

 Claudette Colbert as Geraldine "Gerry" Jeffers
 Joel McCrea as Tom Jeffers (alias "Captain McGlue")
 Mary Astor as The Princess Centimillia (Maud)
 Rudy Vallée as John D. Hackensacker III
 Sig Arno as Toto
 Robert Dudley as Wienie King
 Esther Howard as Wife of Wienie King
 Franklin Pangborn as Apartment Manager
 Arthur Hoyt as Pullman Conductor
 Al Bridge as Conductor
 Fred "Snowflake" Toones as George, Club Car Bartender     
 Charles R. Moore as Train Porter
 Frank Moran as Brakeman
 Harry Rosenthal as Orchestra Leader
 J. Farrell MacDonald as Officer O'Donnell

The Ale and Quail Club:
 Robert Warwick as Mr. Hinch
 Arthur Stuart Hull as Mr. Osmond
 Torben Meyer as Dr. Kluck
 Victor Potel as Mr. McKeewie
 Jimmy Conlin as Mr. Asweld
 Unnamed members played by:
 William Demarest
 Jack Norton
 Robert Greig
 Roscoe Ates
 Dewey Robinson
 Chester Conklin
 Sheldon Jett

Production
At least part of the initial inspiration for The Palm Beach Story may have come to Preston Sturges from close to home.  Not only had he shuttled back and forth to Europe as a young man, his ex-wife Eleanor Hutton was an heiress who moved among the European aristocracy, and had once been wooed by Prince Jerome Rospigliosi-Gioeni. One scene in the film is based upon an incident that had happened to Sturges and his mother while traveling by train to Paris, where the car with their compartment and baggage was uncoupled while they were in the dining car.

The story Sturges came up with was entitled Is Marriage Necessary?, which, along with an alternative, Is That Bad?, became a working title for the film. The original title was rejected by Hays Office censors, who also rejected the script submitted by Paramount over its "sex suggestive situations...and dialogue." In spite of changes the script was still tabled because of its "light treatment of marriage and divorce" and overt parodying of John D. Rockefeller. More changes were made, including reducing Princess Centimillia's divorces from eight to three (plus two annulments), before the script finally was approved.

This was Sturges' second collaboration with Joel McCrea, following Sullivan's Travels from the previous year and they worked again on The Great Moment, filmed in 1942 (but released in 1944). Although Colbert and Sturges worked on The Big Pond (1930) and the first version of Imitation of Life (1934), The Palm Beach Story was the only time they worked on a movie Sturges wrote and directed.

The movie was Rudy Vallee's first outright comedic role, and he gained a contract with Paramount, as well as an award for Best Actor of 1942 from the National Board of Review. He appeared in Sturges' The Sin of Harold Diddlebock, Unfaithfully Yours and The Beautiful Blonde from Bashful Bend.

Many members of Sturges' unofficial "stock company" of character actors appear in film, such as Al Bridges, Chester Conklin, Jimmy Conlin, William Demarest, Robert Dudley, Byron Foulger, Robert Greig, Harry Hayden, Arthur Hoyt, Torben Meyer, Frank Moran, Charles R. Moore, Jack Norton, Franklin Pangborn, Victor Potel, Dewey Robinson, Harry Rosenthal, Julius Tannen and Robert Warwick.

This was the seventh of ten films written by Preston Sturges in which William Demarest appeared.

Claudette Colbert received $150,000 for her role, and Joel McCrea was paid $60,000.

The second unit did background shooting at Penn Station in Manhattan. The film went into general release on 1 January 1943. It was released on video in the U.S. on 12 July 1990 and re-released on 30 June 1993.

Reception

In 1998, Jonathan Rosenbaum of the Chicago Reader included the film in his unranked list of the best American films not included on the AFI Top 100.

In 2000, the American Film Institute included the film in AFI's 100 Years...100 Laughs (#77).

References

External links

 
 
 
 
  Archival New York Times Review by Bosley Crowther, December 11, 1942
 Greatest Films- The Palm Beach Story Critique and thorough plot description/analysis.
 The Palm Beach Story at Portico
 The Palm Beach Story on Screen Guild Theater: March 15, 1943
The Palm Beach Story: Love in a Warm Climate an essay by Stephanie Zacharek for the Criterion Collection

1942 films
1942 romantic comedy films
1940s screwball comedy films
American romantic comedy films
American screwball comedy films
American black-and-white films
Films about twins
Films scored by Victor Young
Films directed by Preston Sturges
Films set in Florida
Rail transport films
Films with screenplays by Preston Sturges
Paramount Pictures films
1940s American films
1940s English-language films